Suzanne Sonye is an American professional road racing cyclist. She was a member of the Saturn Cycling Team from 2000 to 2002. In 2007, while Sonye was working as a soigneur for Rock Racing, cyclist Kayle Leogrande told her that he was concerned about being caught for doping. She subsequently turned Leogrande in to the United States Anti-Doping Agency, which eventually gave him a two-year suspension.

Sonye was born in Lynwood, California.

Results

References

Living people
American female cyclists
1968 births
People from Lynwood, California
21st-century American women